Kulali may refer to:
Aygedzor, Armenia
Karmir Gyukh, Armenia
Karmir-Kulali, Armenia